The omul, Coregonus migratorius, also known as Baikal omul, is a whitefish species of the salmon family endemic to Lake Baikal in Siberia, Russia.  It is considered a delicacy and is the object of one of the largest commercial fisheries on Lake Baikal. In 2004, it was listed in Russia as an endangered species.

Taxonomy
The omul has traditionally been regarded as a subspecies of the Arctic cisco Coregonus autumnalis. However, recent genetic studies have shown it actually belongs to the circumpolar Coregonus lavaretus-clupeaformis complex of lake whitefishes, which also has other members in Lake Baikal, and it is now considered its own species within Coregonus. The four or five traditionally accepted subpopulations of omul within Lake Baikal are: North Baikal (северобайкальский), Selenga (селенгинский), Chivyrkui (чивыркуйский) and Posolsk (посольский).  These vary in size, feeding behaviors and preferred spawning habitats.  The extent of their reproductive isolation is debated.

Description 
The omul is a slender, pelagic fish with light silver sides and a darker back.  It has small spots on its dorsal fin and larger ones on its head, a terminal mouth position and a large number of gill rakers, typical of fish that feed in the pelagic zone.  The mean size of adults is 36–38 cm and 0.6 to 0.8 kg, though the maximum reported length is 56 cm weighing about 2.5 kg.  The subpopulations on the northern end of the lake tend to be smaller.

Behavior
The omul feeds primarily on zooplankton, smaller fish, and occasionally some benthic organisms. It feeds primarily in the rich pelagic zone of Lake Baikal up to 345–450 m.  It is a relatively long-lived, iteroparous species that attains reproductive maturity at five to 15 years of age.  The omul only enters the rivers that feed Lake Baikal to spawn, like the Selenga, initiating short spawning migrations, usually in mid-October, broadcasting 8000-30000 eggs before returning to the lake.

Consumption and fishery
Omul is one of the primary food resources for people living in the Baikal region.  It is considered a delicacy throughout Russia, and export to the west is of some economic importance.   Smoked omul is widely sold around the lake and is one of the highlights for many travelers on the Trans-Siberian railway, and locals tend to prefer the fish salted.  A popular Siberian salad called stroganina consists of uncooked frozen omul shaved thinly and served with pepper, salt and onion.

Due to its high demand, the omul is the object of one of the most important commercial fisheries in Lake Baikal.  The highest recorded annual landed catches occurred in 1940s and amounted to 60-80 thousand tonnes.  A subsequent crash in the population led to a closing of the fishery in 1969, followed by a reopening with strict quotas in 1974 after some recovery of the stocks.<ref name=Galazin>Galazin, G.I. (1978) Рыбные ресурсы Байкала и их использование (Fish resources of Baikal and their exploitation).  Problemy Baikala, Siberian Division of the Russian Academy of Sciences, Novosibirsk, v. 16 (36). (in Russian) </ref>  Currently, the omul fishery accounts for roughly two-thirds of the total Lake Baikal fishery.  Fluctuations in the population and intensive fishing make sustaining the fishery one of the highest priorities for local fisheries managers.

Conservation
The omul's main food source is an endemic species of alga, melosira''.

Gallery

See also
Stroganina

References

External links

Coregonus
Fish of Lake Baikal
Fish described in 1775
Taxa named by Johann Gottlieb Georgi